Beri State was a princely state of the Bundelkhand Agency of the British Raj. Its capital was at Beri, a small town, about 30 km from Hamirpur town. 

In 1901, the state spanned an area of about 82.87 km2 with a population of 4,297 inhabitants in 1901. Together with Baoni State (Kadaura) at its northwestern edge Beri State was forming an enclave within the directly administered British territory of the Central Provinces.

See also
Political integration of India

References

External links
Beri – Indian Rajputs

Princely states of India
Hamirpur district, Uttar Pradesh
Rajputs
1750s establishments in India
1950 disestablishments in India